Extracts from the Album A Hard Day's Night is the Beatles seventh official EP, released on 6 November 1964. This EP contains four tracks from the album that were not featured in the film. Its catalogue number is Parlophone GEP 8924. It was also released in France.

Track listing
All songs written by John Lennon and Paul McCartney.

Side A
"Any Time at All" – 2:14
"I'll Cry Instead" – 2:06

Side B
"Things We Said Today" – 2:38
"When I Get Home" – 2:19

Personnel
George Harrison – Lead guitar, classical guitar, backing vocals
John Lennon – vocals, rhythm guitar, acoustic guitar, piano
Paul McCartney – vocals, bass, piano
Ringo Starr – drums, percussion

UK EP sales chart performance
Entry Date : 9 January 1965
Highest Position : 8
Weeks in Chart : 17 Weeks

References

1964 EPs
Albums produced by George Martin
The Beatles EPs
Parlophone EPs